Arthur Harold "Art" Harnden (May 20, 1924 – September 30, 2016) was an American athlete, winner of the gold medal in the 4 × 400 m relay at the 1948 Summer Olympics. He was born in Lavaca County, Texas. At the London Olympics Harnden ran the opening leg in the gold medal winning American 4 × 400 m relay team.

References

Arthur Harden's obituary

1924 births
2016 deaths
American male sprinters
Athletes (track and field) at the 1948 Summer Olympics
Olympic gold medalists for the United States in track and field
Medalists at the 1948 Summer Olympics